Terry "The Titan" Hayhurst (born March 11, 1985) is a former professional Canadian darts player from Brantford, Ontario. His accomplishments include winning the Canadian Open in 2010 and 2012. In 2011, he was ranked #12 in the world and #2 in the Americas by the World Darts Federation.

Darts competitions
Hayhurst was the youngest junior darts player to win a Canadian national title, at the age of 12. He went on to win four more national junior singles titles, eight national junior doubles titles, two national mixed doubles titles, eight national junior team titles, and eight Canada Cup titles.

In May 2009, Hayhurst won his first NDFC Canadian national championship. For the 2009–2010 season, Hayhurst held the #1 position in Canada for 12 months. In 2011, Hayhurst represented Canada at the WDF World Cup team in Castlebar, Ireland.

References

External links 
 National Dart Federation of Canada
 World Darts Federation

1985 births
Living people
British Darts Organisation players
Canadian darts players
Professional Darts Corporation associate players
Sportspeople from Brantford